Úna Palliser is an Irish born, London-based violinist, violist, singer and multi-instrumentalist who as well as being classically trained, is recognised for her proficiency in many musical genres, including rock, jazz, Balkan and Irish folk. She is best known for her collaborations and role as guest soloist with many high profile artists, including Shakira, A.R.Rahman, Leona Lewis, Terrafolk and Otis Taylor and as the Irish folk singer on several film and television soundtracks, including Mo Ghile Mear on the Specsavers 'Collie Wobble' advertisement. Herself (film), Obi-Wan Kenobi (TV series), My Mother and Other Strangers and Kat and Alfie: Redwater.

Biography

Early life
Una was born in Cork, Ireland where she began learning the violin at 4 years old at the Cork School of Music. She also studied piano and viola and later was a member of the European Union Youth Orchestra under Vladimir Ashkenazy. 
Palliser won a number of awards including Wolfson Trust Award, a Philharmonia Martin Musical Scholarship Award, and was a string finalist in the RTÉ Millennium Musician of the Future Competition. She won a scholarship to the Royal Academy of Music in London where she studied with Garfield Jackson of the Endellion Quartet for 4 years before graduating with a 1st Class Hons Degree in performance.

Career
Una has recorded and performed as a session musician with many artists such as The Killers, Michael Buble, Little Mix, Dionne Warwick, Melanie C, Emma Bunton, P Diddy, Buena Vista Social Club, Robbie Williams, Julian Lennon, Ariana Grande, Josh Groban, Gwilym Simcock, Tim Garland, Maxim Vengerov, Liam Gallagher, The Noisettes, and Elbow. She has performed on a number of television shows including Later With Jools Holland, Late Night with Conan O'Brien, Top of the Pops and Friday Night with Jonathan Ross and appeared in music videos with Mark Ronson, Richard Ashcroft and Josh Groban. Palliser has also recorded on a number of film and television scores including The Lovely Bones, The Princess, Obi-Wan Kenobi, Three Girls, The Cube, and Hold the Sunset.

Palliser was the featured lead singer and violinist/violist on the single 'Still Resist The Storm' on BBC World Music Award Winning ensemble Terrafolk's record Full Circle, which topped the radioplay charts in Slovenia. This led to many years touring and performing internationally as a featured guest artist with Terrafolk and a performance as solo violinist and vocalist with the European Symbolic Orchestra.

She toured Europe as part of Cee-lo Green and Danger Mouse (musician)'s band Gnarls Barkley, as solo violinist/violist on Patrick Wolf's The Magic Position tour of the US and Europe supporting Amy Winehouse and Arcade Fire. She also performed as featured violist on Take That's Beautiful World Tour 2007.

Palliser later toured as violinist with Moby on his Wait For Me tour. and with George Michael on his Symphonica Tour. She also joined Dresden Dolls' Amanda Palmer as guest solo violinist on her UK tour and other subsequent UK performances, also performing with Neil Gaiman. Palliser joined Avalanche City playing violin, glockenspiel, accordion and backing vocals for their UK tour, She has also performed and toured many times as solo violinist with Otis Taylor and toured as backing singer and violinist with Elbow.
and as solo violinist with Leona Lewis.

In 2014, Palliser featured in "The Secret Life of Materials", a documentary by Met Films in which she tried out and performed on one of the world's first 3D printed violins.

In 2016, Palliser performed on violin and as singer in the All Irish production of Taming of the Shrew at Shakespeare's Globe where she also sang one of her own compositions in the role of Kate's absent mother. She later performed in Sam Wanamaker Playhouse in Inn at Lydda.

In 2018, Palliser returned to Shakespeare's Globe as musical director and violinist of All's Well That Ends Well at Sam Wanmaker Playhouse.

Palliser's solo vocals and playing was featured in Jez Butterworth 's The Ferryman (play) directed by Sam Mendes at Bernard B. Jacobs Theatre on Broadway in 2018–19 following a multi award winning run in London's West End at Royal Court Theatre and Gielgud Theatre.

Palliser performed as guest violin soloist with Indian composer and singer A.R. Rahman at Wembley Arena in July 2017 to celebrate 25 years of his music. She later performed with Rahman at the International Indian Film Academy Awards at the MetLife Stadium in New York. In October 2017 Palliser rejoined Rahman on his Australian and New Zealand tour and later on his Canadian tour.

In 2019 Palliser sang the solo vocals of Vangelis score of Blade Runner at The Royal Albert Hall as the part of Avex International's premiere production of Blade Runner Live film with 12 live musicians. In 2021 she toured the UK with the project. Palliser also led the strings playing electric violin on the project.

Palliser performed as violin soloist with Philharmonia Orchestra and Philharmonia Chorus in February 2022 at Royal Festival Hall London, at the premiere of Outlander (TV series) series 6. The orchestra performed a 15 minute suite before a showing of the first episode of the series with live orchestra, solo fiddle and solo whistles playing the score composed by Bear McCreary. The concert was conducted by James Shearman

Palliser has been described as an 'extraordinary violinist' by the UK's The Independent newspaper. and her voice has been described as 'haunting' by both Metro and Songlines.

Shakira
Shakira invited Palliser to feature as the solo violinist on The Sun Comes Out World Tour where she also sang back up vocals as well as played the accordion, whistles and strohviol. She had a four-minute improvised solo intro to the last song of Shakira's main set, 'Ojos Asi'.

Vocals
Palliser's recording of the Irish folk song "Mo Ghile Mear" has been used on the Specsavers 'Sheep' advert since 2008. She also appears as solo vocalist on Joglaresa’s Christmas album ‘Sing We Yule’ with her version of Don Oíche Úd i mBeithil.

In 2022 her vocals featured on Natalie Holt’s score for Obi-Wan Kenobi (TV series), part of the Star Wars franchise. Palliser’s solo vocals are featured on the soundtrack of 2020 film Herself (film) directed by Phyllida Lloyd singing her arrangement of Irish ballad Lass of Aughrim. She is the solo Irish singer on the end credits of BBC six part tv series My Mother and Other Strangers and the singer of the theme tune for BBC 6 part series Kat and Alfie: Redwater. Her voice was also heard as the unseen Banshee and also singing a setting of The Stolen Child by WB Yeats in the multi Tony Award winning play The Ferryman in London’s West End and on Broadway.

She is the lead singer and violinist in the four-member band Una & the Balkan Bears which completed its first UK / Ireland tour in May 2010, ending with a performance at Ronnie Scott's Jazz Club in London. Una returned to Ireland in 2013 with her Balkan duo Balkish with accordionist Marko Hatlak to perform alongside Capercaillie.

Personal life
Palliser currently lives in London. She is married to chef James 'Jocky' Petrie, former Head of Creative Development at The Fat Duck and current Group Executive Chef for Gordon Ramsay They have two daughters Her brother Conor Palliser is a conductor and pianist and brother Ronan Palliser is a photographer. Her father plays Irish folk music including harmonica and whistles.

Tours
The Rock Orchestra (guest orchestra leader, various UK tour dates, 2021–22)
Blade Runner Live (solo vocals, strings leader, electric violin, 2019-2021)
ABC (viola, 2018)
A. R. Rahman (solo violin, 2017/18)
Elbow (violin, backing vocals 2017/18)
Pete Tong with Heritage Orchestra (viola, 2016–2018)
Michael Buble (uk only-violin 2014)
Otis Taylor (solo violin 2011–2013)
George Michael Symphonica Tour (viola 2012)
Avalanche City (solo violin, vocals, accordion 2012)
Shakira The Sun Comes Out World Tour (solo violin, electric violin, strohviol, accordion, whistle, percussion, backing vocals, 2010–11)
Moby (violin, electric violin, 2009)
Take That Beautiful World Tour 2007 (viola, 2007)
Patrick Wolf The Magic Position Tour (solo electric violin, viola, 2007)
Gnarls Barkley (violin, viola, 2006)

Theatre

Come From Away - (dep solo violin/fiddle) - 2019-2022 Phoenix Theatre, London

Hamilton (musical) - (dep violin / viola) - 2021/2022 Victoria Palace Theatre

Moulin Rouge! (musical) - (dep violin / viola) - 2022 Piccadilly Theatre

Measure For Measure - (dep violin/vocals) - 2021 Sam Wanamaker Playhouse Shakespeare's Globe

Small Island – (pre-recorded viola) – 2019, 2022 Royal National Theatre

Heart of a Dog - (pre-recorded violin, viola, octave viola) Everyman Palace Theatre

All's Well That Ends Well – (musical director, violin, viola) – 2018 Sam Wanamaker Playhouse

The Ferryman (play) (pre recorded solo vocals, violin/viola)

– 2018–2019 Bernard B. Jacobs Theatre Broadway

– 2017/18 Gielgud Theatre

– 2017 Royal Court Theatre

The Inn at Lydda – (strohviol, violin) – 2016 Sam Wanamaker Playhouse

The Taming of the Shrew (actor-musician + singer) – 2016 – Shakespeare's Globe

Macbeth (dep /understudy solo singer) – 2016 – Shakespeare's Globe

Tribute to Stefan Zweig (improvised violin) – 2015 – Arts Theatre

Reading with Bach (violin with contemporary dance choreography) – 2014 – Trinity Laban

María de Buenos Aires (actor-musician) – 2013 – Cork Opera House

Pagliacci (actor-musician) – 2012 – Everyman Palace Theatre

Abba The Show (violin) – 2012/13 – European tour

Lord of the Rings (musical) (dep viola) – 2007/8 – Theatre Royal, Drury Lane

I Love You, You're Perfect, Now Change -St Andrew's Theatre Dublin Kings Head Theatre + Edinburgh Festival Fringe

Graffiti Classics World Tour (actor-musician)

Discography

Solo
Specsavers 'Collie Wobble' commercial (solo vocals, arranger) – Soundtree Music – 2008

Obi-Wan Kenobi Film Score (vocals) - 2022

Herself Film Score (solo vocals, arranger) - 2020

JOY Short Film Score
(solo vocals) - 2020

Hold the Sunset BBC series soundtrack (Musical Director/coach, solo violin, 2019)

With Joglaresa 
  Sing We Yule Christmas Album
(solo vocals, arranger) - 2017

Kat and Alfie: Redwater BBC television series (solo vocals, violin) – 2017

My Mother and Other Strangers BBC television series (solo vocals, violin) – 2016

With Birdy
Growing Pains – Beautiful Lies album (erhu), 2016

With Tom Hickox
Angel of the North – War, Peace and Diplomacy album (stroh violin, 2014)

with Kelli Scarr
Dangling Teeth (violin, 2012)

with Shakira
Je ľaime a mourir (solo violin, string arranger, 2011)
Live From Paris (solo violin, vocals, accordion, strohviol, 2011)

with Terrafolk
Still Resist the Storm (solo vocals, violin, viola)  – single – Full Circle Album- Music Net, Menart (2008)

with Take That
Beautiful World Live –  Universal (viola, 2008)

'with Smoke Fairies
Troubles – Music For Heroes Records (solo fiddle, viola, 2008)

Other recordings

The Princess (2022 action film)
(viola 2022)

 With Yeah Yeah Yeahs
Cool It Down album (viola, 2022) With Liam Gallagher
Why Me, Why Not album (viola, 2022)

With Nick Powell (musician/composer)
Walls Fall Down album (vocals 2021)

With Little Mix
Little Mix The Search (violin / viola 2020)

With Robbie Williams
The Christmas Present album (violin, 2019)

With J Hus
Must Be single (Viola, 2019)

 With Judith Owen 
I Still Dream of America single (viola, 2019)

The Dumping Ground BBC series soundtrack (viola, 2016–22)

 With Beverley Craven
Let It Be Me – Woman to Woman album (viola, 2018)

 with Elbow
Golden Slumbers – John Lewis Christmas Advert – (violin, viola, 2017)

Three Girls (miniseries)

BBC television series soundtrack – (violin, viola, 2017)

with Liam Gallagher
For What Its Worth – live from Air Studios (viola 2017)

with Anton Du Beke
From The Top album - Polydor (viola, 2017)

Funny Girl (musical)  London Cast Recording –  (violin, viola, 2016)

with Ghostpoet 
Shedding Skin – Play It Again Sam
Be Right Back, Moving House –  Play It Again Sam (viola 2015)
Nothin In The Way –  Play It Again Sam (viola 2015)

with Celeste
Celeste (violin, 2015)

with George Michael
Symphonica (viola, 2014)

With Elsten Torres
The Only One (violin, string arrangement, 2013)

with Russell Watson
Anthems album – Sony (violin 2012)

with Katie Melua
Secret Symphony Dramatico (viola 2012)

with Carl Barat
So Long My Lover – PIAS Recordings, Arcady Records (violin, viola 2010)
Ode to a Girl – PIAS Recordings, Arcady Records (violin, viola 2010)

with The Killers
A Dustland Fairytale  – Live at Abbey Road – Channel 4 (viola 2010)

with The Choirgirl Isabel
The Choirgirl album – Universal UK (violin, viola, 2010)
with Aled Jones
Aled's Christmas Gift album (viola, 2010)
with Lisa Lois
Smoke album – SBC/Sony BMG – (viola, 2010)
with Paloma Faith
Do You Want The Truth Or Something Beautiful? – Sony Music (viola, 2009)
with Noisettes / Radio 1's Live Lounge CD
When We Were Young (Killers cover) BBC Radio (viola, 2009)
with Brian Eno
The Lovely Bones Soundtrack (viola, 2009)

With The Brand New Heavies
C'est Magnifique single (viola, 2009)

with Hannah Waddingham
Oh Holy Night - Christmas In New York album - Spekulation Entertainment (viola, 2009)

with Mark Ronson ft Amy Winehouse
Valerie video (viola, 2008)
with Tony Christie
Made in Sheffield album (viola, 2008)
with Peter Kay / Geraldine McQueen
Once Upon a Christmas Song – Polydor Records (viola, string arrangements, 2008)
with Gary Barlow / Eliot Kennedy
Without You / Brittania High soundtrack –  Polydor Records – (viola, string arrangements, 2008)
with Peter Raeburn
You and Me album – Nowever Records (violin, viola, 2008)
with Gnarls Barkley / Later with Jools Holland CD
Crazy – BBC (viola/violin, 2007)
with Nicky Spence
My First Love album - Universal Classics / Decca (viola, 2007)
with All Angels
All Angels – Universal (viola, 2006)
with The Shapeshifters
Beautiful Heartache – Positiva, EMI (viola, 2006)
with Hugh Cornwell
Gingerbread Girl – Koch Entertainment (viola, 2000)

BBC One's 'Let's Dance' TV theme – BBC (violin, viola)

'Love on a Saturday Night' TV theme – London Weekend Television / ITV (vocals)

Six Degrees of Summer  Short Film Score - O2 Guru / Martha Fiennes (violin/viola)

Cast Offs Short Film Score - Garrick Hamm (violin / viola)

Eva Short Film Score – Jeva Films (solo vocals)

By Hook Short Film Score – Virgin Media Shorts / Laura Evers Johns (solo vocals)

Every Good Boy Does Fine Short Film Score – Factory Gate Productions (solo violin)

Trident 'Splash' commercial – Soundtree Music (composer, string arranger, violin)

Landrover ‘Glider’ commercial - Soundtree Music (violin, viola)

Guinness ‘World’ commercial - Soundtree Music (violin, viola)

Smirnoff ' Sea' commercial – Soundtree Music (violin, viola)

Royal Mail 'Grow' commercial – Soundtree Music (violin, viola)

Nokia 'Harmony' commercial – Soundtree Music (vocals)

See also
 Kat and Alfie: Redwater
 Ojos Asi
 Mo Ghile Mear
 Strohviol

References

External links
Official Facebook page

Living people
Musicians from Cork (city)
Irish expatriates in the United Kingdom
Irish violinists
Irish violists
Irish women singers
Year of birth missing (living people)
Musicians from London
21st-century violinists
Pop violists
21st-century violists